The seep frog or Balu oriental frog (Occidozyga baluensis) is a species of frog in the family Dicroglossidae. It is probably endemic to Borneo.

Range
Occidozyga baluensis is found in northwestern Borneo (Sarawak, Malaysia, Brunei, and Kalimantan, Indonesia) and was also recorded once in Lampung, Sumatra, although the latter is questionable. Its name refers to its type locality, "Mount Kina Balu, North Borneo".

Description
Occidozyga baluensis are small–medium-sized frogs. Dorsal colouration is variable, brown, grey, or olive, sometimes with dark markings. Some individuals have a vertebral stripe. The belly is cream with an abundance of brown spots. Tadpoles have a long tail with low tail fin; the tip is pointed. The mouth is terminal in position and the orifice appears quite small.

Habitat
Occidozyga baluensis inhabit shallow ponds or water-filled depressions where clear water seeps out at the base of a slope. Tadpoles live in the shallow water film that covers the leaf litter in seepage areas. They are predatory and ingest small invertebrates. The species is threatened by habitat loss caused by clear-cutting.

References

External links
 Sound recordings of Sleep frog at BioAcoustica

Occidozyga
Endemic fauna of Borneo
Amphibians of Brunei
Amphibians of Indonesia
Amphibians of Malaysia
Amphibians described in 1896
Taxa named by George Albert Boulenger
Taxonomy articles created by Polbot
Amphibians of Borneo